Jakle or Jäkle is a surname. Notable people with the surname include:

Hansjörg Jäkle (born 1971), German ski jumper 
Kelley Jakle (born 1989), American actress and singer-songwriter